Cull Island, also known as Culls Island and Gull Island, is an island off the south coast of Western Australia in the Recherche Archipelago.

Cull Island is uninhabited but is home to a group of wild goats which roam the island. It also has a colony of little penguins and is one of the main nesting grounds for the Cape Barren goose.

It was installed with an acetylene-powered light in 1965 but was converted to an automatic solar-powered flashing light in 1984.

On 5 January 2020, a man was killed by a great white shark while diving at Cull Island.

See also
List of islands of Western Australia
List of islands of Australia

References

Recherche Archipelago
Uninhabited islands of Australia